Maribor is a city in Slovenia.

Maribor may also refer to:

 Maribor Edvard Rusjan Airport
 Maribor Generals, an American football club.
 NK Maribor, an association football club.
 Roman Catholic Archdiocese of Maribor
 Žametovka or Maribor vine, a red wine grape variety